Jean Gachassin (born 23 December 1941) is a former French rugby union footballer from Bagnères-de-Bigorre, Hautes-Pyrénées. Gachassin is also the former President of the Fédération Française de Tennis.

He was a French international rugby union player.  His usual positions were wing three quarter, center three quarter, fullback and fly half. In fact he was so versatile that he played every back position for France with the exception of scrum half. He was a part of the France national rugby union team which won its first Grand Slam in the 1968 Five Nations tournament. Gachassin played as an international for France from 1961 to 1969. He was nicknamed Peter Pan and several other nicknames because of his diminutive size. He is considered one  of the best backs France ever produced and scored some of the most spectacular tries of the 1960s.

External links

 ESPNscrum.com

Living people
French rugby union players
Rugby union centres
Rugby union fly-halves
Rugby union fullbacks
Rugby union wings
France international rugby union players
1941 births
Presidents of the French Tennis Federation
Sportspeople from Hautes-Pyrénées
FC Lourdes players